Bad Sisters (originally titled Emerald) is an Irish black comedy television series developed by Sharon Horgan, Dave Finkel, and Brett Baer. Set in Dublin and filmed on location in Ireland, it is based on the Flemish series Clan, which was created by Malin-Sarah Gozin. The first two episodes aired on 19 August 2022. Apple TV+ renewed the series for a second season on 8 November 2022.

Premise
The five Garvey sisters—Eva, Grace, Ursula, Bibi, and Becka—live in present-day Dublin. After Grace's abusive, controlling husband John Paul dies unexpectedly, the sisters find themselves at the centre of a life insurance investigation. The series flips between timelines—one before John Paul's death, in which Grace's sisters plot to murder their brother-in-law, and another after his death, in which a determined insurance agent tries to prove the sisters' malicious involvement to save his struggling business.

Cast

Main
 Sharon Horgan as Eva Garvey, the eldest sister of the Garvey family. Protective of her younger sisters, having taken care of them after their parents' death, she is single, with her infertility having affected her past relationships. She comes into conflict with John Paul over his treatment of her sister Grace and niece Blánaid. Eva and John Paul are co-workers at an architectural firm, and further conflict arises when both apply for the same promotion
 Anne-Marie Duff as Grace Williams, the second eldest sister of the Garvey family. John Paul's wife and Blánaid's mother, she is controlled and routinely belittled by her husband, from whom she has minimal independence. Her relationship with her sisters becomes distant due to her continual need to defend her husband's poor behavior
 Eva Birthistle as Ursula Flynn, the middle sister of the Garvey family. Wife to Donal and mother of three children, one of whom has Down syndrome, she works as a nurse and is having an extramarital affair with her photography instructor Ben. She comes into conflict with John Paul after he discovers her affair, threatens to inform her husband, and tricks her into sending him a nude photo
 Sarah Greene as Bibi Garvey, second youngest sister of the Garvey family. A lesbian, she is married to Nora and mother to an adopted son. She lost her right eye in a car crash caused by John Paul. She is the impetus for the sisters' decision to murder John Paul
 Eve Hewson as Becka Garvey, youngest sister of the Garvey family. A massage therapist with aspirations to open her own studio, she comes into conflict with John Paul after he reneges on his agreement to invest in her business. Becka begins a relationship with Matthew Claffin, not realizing that he and his half-brother are investigating John Paul's death
 Brian Gleeson as Thomas ("Tom") Claffin, insurance agent at Claffin & Sons, which holds John Paul's life insurance policy. Thomas has recently taken over the family business, which his father mismanaged before committing suicide. Knowing that the settling the claim will bankrupt the business, he is determined to avoid a payout by proving the Garvey sisters guilty of foul play
 Daryl McCormack as Matthew ("Matt") Claffin, half-brother of Thomas. Formerly a bassist in a London band, Matthew comes to work at Claffin & Sons after his father's death. He begins a relationship with Becka, not realizing she is a suspect in his insurance investigation
 Assaad Bouab as Gabriel, Eva and John Paul's co-worker. He develops a friendship with Eva, which she mistakes as romantic interest. He reveals to her that he is gay, although not out at work
 Claes Bang as John Paul ("JP") Williams, Grace's husband, Blánaid's father, and a co-worker of Eva. A controlling and abusive man, he exerts complete control over his wife and daughter's lives and comes into conflict with the rest of the Garvey sisters. He is recently deceased at the beginning of the series, but the circumstances of his death are uncertain

Recurring
 Yasmine Akram as Nora Garvey, Bibi's wife
 Peter Coonan as Ben, an artist and photography instructor who is having an affair with Ursula
 Lloyd Hutchinson as Gerald Fisher, Eva and John Paul's boss
 Seána Kerslake as Theresa Claffin, Thomas's pregnant wife
 Nina Norén as Minna Williams, John Paul's mother who suffers from dementia
 Jonjo O'Neill as Donal Flynn, Ursula's husband who works as a paramedic
 Saise Quinn as Blánaid Williams, Grace and John Paul's 12-year-old daughter
 Michael Smiley as Roger Muldoon, Grace and John Paul's neighbor who leads a local youth church group
 Barry Ward as Fergal Loftus, a Garda inspector

Episodes

Production

Development
In September 2021, it was officially announced Sharon Horgan would co-write, produce and star in what was then titled Emerald for Apple TV+ as developed by her production company Merman. Malin-Sarah Gozin, the creator of the series' inspiration Clan, joined the project as an executive producer alongside Bert Hamelinck and Michael Sagol for the Belgian Caviar Films. Other producers were Faye Dorn and Clelia Mountford for Merman as well as Brett Baer and Dave Finkel. The series was created as part of Horgan's Apple TV+ deal.

Casting
The cast was initially believed to include Assaad Bouab, Eve Hewson, and Brendan Gleeson in early reports. The cast was later confirmed in March 2022, with Anne-Marie Duff, Eva Birthistle, and Sarah Greene, and Hewson set to star alongside Horgan. Claes Bang, Brian Gleeson, Daryl McCormack, Bouab, and Saise Quinn complete the ensemble.

Filming 
Principal photography took place in 2021. Cast and crew were reported filming in and around Dublin at locations such as Sandycove, the Forty Foot, Howth, and Malahide in August. They would also film in Belfast.

Title sequence 
The title sequence depicts a physical Rube Goldberg style machine made from dangerous objects and props from the show that foreshadow narrative elements in the main storyline. The sequence was mostly hand-made, designed and made by Peter Anderson Studio. The theme music is a cover of Leonard Cohen's "Who by Fire" performed by PJ Harvey.

Reception

Critical response 
The review aggregator website Rotten Tomatoes reported a 100% approval rating with an average rating of 8.2/10, based on 52 critic reviews. The website's critics consensus reads, "Dark secrets are a family affair in Bad Sisters, a riotously funny murder mystery that makes fine use of its gifted ensemble while exemplifying creator and star Sharon Horgan's penchant for salty warmth." Metacritic, which uses a weighted average, assigned a score of 79 out of 100 based on 22 critics, indicating "generally favourable reviews". IndieWire graded it B and says: 
Aside from a few minor red herrings, “Bad Sisters” sets a trajectory and sticks to it for much of the run. As a dramedy of errors, “Bad Sisters” doesn’t always feel like the freshest or most elegant execution. But as a family showcase, the engine is there to power this show through an ordeal of any length.

The Hollywood Reporter called it "Fun but Empty" and said:
...it’s a bit of an oddity — easy to breeze through but a little too mordant to be sincere, a little too heavy to be hilarious, a little too sour to be purely fun.

The Atlantic called it "a semi-comic murder caper" and said:
The setup of Bad Sisters is deliberately absurd, a throwback to sillier shows such as Desperate Housewives and Why Women Kill. The ease with which the Garvey sisters decide to kill John Paul, and their resoluteness when their attempts repeatedly and catastrophically fail, are pure fantasy.

Variety (magazine) said:
Bad Sisters is less about the mystery than its cutting, empathetic take on all the relationships that tangled into such an overwhelming knot along the way.

Accolades

References

External links
 

2020s British black comedy television series
2022 British television series debuts
2022 Irish television series debuts
Apple TV+ original programming
British television series based on non-British television series
Television shows filmed in Northern Ireland
Television shows filmed in the Republic of Ireland
Television shows set in Dublin (city)
Television shows set in London
Television series by ABC Studios